"Freeze" is the third and final single from R&B singer T-Pain from his third album, Thr33 Ringz. The song features singer Chris Brown. The song was released on iTunes on October 10  and was added to T-Pain's MySpace on October 17. A version that features Omarion was originally on the album, but was changed to Chris Brown.

Critical response
The Guardian editor Alex Macpherson praised the production: "Thr33 Ringz' humour is still superbly crass and mostly enjoyable, especially when allied with the skittering beats and post-funk bounce of Freeze." Jesal 'Jay Soul' Padania of RapReviews.com called this song nice enough. Eric Henderson wrote a positive review: "Freeze" might be another freeze-dried Chris Brown upper, but it boasts the cleanest production this side of Ne-Yo."

Music video
The shoot for the music video was released on YouTube on September 30 by Mike & Rocco (reality). The video was set to premiere on January 5, 2009 but leaked on December 31, 2008 and was officially released on January 1, 2009 via MTV Jams.

Chart positions

"Freeze" debuted at number 38 on the Billboard Hot 100 in the US with downloads only, and also debuted at number 45 on the Canadian Hot 100 and number 62 on the UK Singles Chart due to digital downloads in those countries. Also in the US it charted on the Hot R&B/Hip-Hop Songs after its physical release at number 39. It has been most successful in Australia and New Zealand peaking at number 26 and number 23 respectively.

References

2008 singles
2008 songs
T-Pain songs
Chris Brown songs
Song recordings produced by T-Pain
Songs written by T-Pain
Songs written by Chris Brown
Jive Records singles